New Zealand took part in the 2008 Summer Olympics in Beijing, China. The country sent 182 competitors, making this its largest ever delegation to the Olympic Games. It was also one of the most successful, equalling New Zealand's combined medal tally from the previous two Summer games.  On 16 August – dubbed "Super Saturday" by journalists – New Zealand had its greatest single day at any Olympics, winning 5 medals: two gold, one silver and two bronze. New Zealand also gained its first Olympic track medal since 1976 when Nick Willis won the silver medal in the men's 1500 metres, becoming the sixth New Zealander to win an Olympic  medal in that event. The success at the Olympics has boosted Athletics participation since then.

Medallists

Delegation
New Zealand sent 182 representatives competing in 17 sports. Seventeen-year-old footballer Merissa Smith (born 11 November 1990) was New Zealand's youngest competitor, while 52-year-old equestrian eventer Mark Todd (born 1 March 1956) was the oldest competitor.

| width=78% align=left valign=top |

The following is the list of number of competitors participating in the Games. Note that reserves in fencing, field hockey, football, and handball are not counted as athletes:

Athletics

Men
Track & road events

Field events

Women
Track & road events

Field events

Combined events – Heptathlon

* The athlete who finished in second place, Lyudmila Blonska of the Ukraine, tested positive for a banned substance. Both the A and the B tests were positive, therefore Blonska was stripped of her silver medal, and Wardell moved up a position.

Key
Note–Ranks given for track events are within the athlete's heat only
Q = Qualified for the next round
q = Qualified for the next round as a fastest loser or, in field events, by position without achieving the qualifying target
NR = National record
N/A = Round not applicable for the event
Bye = Athlete not required to compete in round

Badminton

Basketball

Women's tournament

Roster

Group play

Canoeing

Slalom

Sprint

Qualification Legend: QS = Qualify to semi-final; QF = Qualify directly to final

Cycling

Road

Track
Pursuit

Omnium

Mountain biking

BMX

Equestrian

Eventing

# – Indicates that points do not count in team total

Show jumping

Field hockey

Men's tournament

Team roster

Group play

Classification match for 7th/8th place

Women's tournament

Team roster

Group play

Classification match for 11th/12th place

Football

Men's tournament

Roster

Group play

Women's tournament

Roster

Group play

Rowing 

Men

Women

Qualification Legend: FA=Final A (medal); FB=Final B (non-medal); FC=Final C (non-medal); FD=Final D (non-medal); FE=Final E (non-medal); FF=Final F (non-medal); SA/B=Semifinals A/B; SC/D=Semifinals C/D; SE/F=Semifinals E/F; QF=Quarterfinals; R=Repechage

Sailing

New Zealand qualified 1 boat for each of the following events. Although Aaron McIntosh and Mark Kennedy qualified for the Tornado class, they did not compete at these Games.

Men

Women

Open

M = Medal race; EL = Eliminated – did not advance into the medal race; CAN = Race cancelled

Shooting

Men

Women

Swimming

Men

Women

Synchronized swimming

Taekwondo

Tennis

Triathlon

Weightlifting

Officials
Chef de Mission: Dave Currie

See also
 New Zealand at the 2008 Summer Paralympics

References

New Zealand Olympic Commtittee
Team for 2008 Olympics

Nations at the 2008 Summer Olympics
2008
Summer Olympics